Amadnews ( Acronym for Agahi "awareness", Mobareze "fighting", Democracy) is an Iranian news website and Telegram channel. Its chief editor was Ruhollah Zam, it was founded by him, Sam Mahmoudi, Majid Niknam and Babak Ejlali.

From 2015 to 2019 Sam Mahmoudi was the media's editor.

Whistleblowing 
Some major stories reported by Amadnews include

 Report about personal bank accounts of Iranian Chief Justice
 Corruption in Astan Quds Razavi
 Saeed Toosi

Telegram channel suspension 
Following request by Iranian government Telegram suspended Amadnews for violence and advertising use of Cocktail Molotov against police during 2017–2018 Iranian protests. The channel was recreated under another ID "sedaiemardom".

Admin arrest and execution 
In October 2019 Ruhollah Zam was arrested by IRGC Intelligence in Iraq and extradited to Iran. He was executed December 2020. The IRGC took control of the Telegram channel.

References 

Persian-language websites
Iranian news websites
News agencies based in Iran